David Hanrahan (born 19 September 1992) is an Irish Gaelic footballer who plays as a goalkeeper for the Cork senior team.

Born in Douglas, Cork, Hanrahan first arrived on the inter-county scene at the age of seventeen when he first linked up with the Cork minor team, before later joining the under-21 and junior sides. He made his senior debut during the 2014 National Football League. Since then Hanrahan has become a regular member of the panel.

At club level Hanrahan plays with Douglas.

Honours

Team

Cork
All-Ireland Junior Football Championship (1): 2013 
Munster Junior Football Championship (1): 2013
Munster Under-21 Football Championship (1): 2013
Munster Minor Football Championship (1): 2010

References

1992 births
Living people
Douglas Gaelic footballers
Cork inter-county Gaelic footballers
Gaelic football goalkeepers